Solenocentrum is a genus of flowering plants from the orchid family, Orchidaceae. It is native to southeastern Central America and northwestern South America, from Costa Rica to Bolivia.

As of June 2014, four species are known:

Solenocentrum asplundii (Garay) Garay - Colombia, Ecuador
Solenocentrum costaricense Schltr. - Costa Rica, Panama
Solenocentrum lueri Dodson & R.Vásquez - Bolivia
Solenocentrum maasii Dressler  - Costa Rica

References

External links 

Cranichideae genera
Cranichidinae